Manoj Rodrigo (born Warnakulasooriya Edrian Manoj Srikantha Rodrigo on 1 November 1983) was a  Sri Lankan cricketer. He was a right-handed batsman and right-arm off-break bowler who played for Sri Lanka Air Force Sports Club. He was born in Chilaw.

Rodrigo, who appeared in the Under-23s team between 2003 and 2004, made a single first-class appearance, in the 2003–04 season, against Sinhalese Sports Club. From the lower-middle order, he scored 8 runs in the first innings in which he batted, and a golden duck in the second.

He bowled 12 overs in the match, conceding 56 runs. He played for Italian cricket league div 2 in 2006/07for padova c.c.& div 1 in 2008-2019 for galicano c.c.,bologna c.c. & pianoro c.c.he played 60 limited over(50overs)matchers & get 2050 runs with 08 (100) & 18(50) & 50 wickets. He followed coaching level 2 & he is doing academy for kids in padova (Italy). He is a coach & player.

External links
Manoj Rodrigo at CricketArchive 

1983 births
Living people
Sri Lankan cricketers
Sri Lanka Air Force Sports Club cricketers
People from Chilaw